Ballbreaker is the thirteenth studio album by Australian hard rock band AC/DC. It was released in 1995 and was re-released in 2005 as part of the AC/DC Remasters series.

Background
Ballbreaker marked the return of drummer Phil Rudd, who had played with AC/DC from 1975 to 1983.  Rudd had left during the Flick of the Switch sessions due to drug problems and his incompatibility with Malcolm Young. According to Arnaud Durieux's book AC/DC: Maximum Rock & Roll, Rudd attended AC/DC's show in Auckland in November 1991 and, after a friendly meeting with the band backstage, made an "open-ended pitch" to rejoin if anything changed with the band's current drummer Chris Slade.  Durieux reports that the band eventually invited Rudd to rejoin and he accepted in August 1994, much to the chagrin of Slade, who had been recording demos with the band in London. Slade told Rock Hard France in June 2001 that he was so disappointed and disgusted that he did not touch his drum kit for three years. Slade would eventually rejoin the band for their performance at the 57th Annual Grammy Awards Ceremony and the 2015 Rock or Bust World Tour following Rudd's legal issues involving illegal drug possession and threatening to kill his former personal assistant, both of which forced him out of the band a second time.

Ballbreaker is also significant for being the only AC/DC album produced by Rick Rubin.  Rubin had been a long-time fan of the band; former AC/DC engineer Tony Platt recalls overhearing the producer working with the Cult on their 1987 LP Electric:

Rubin's first assignment with AC/DC had been "Big Gun," which appeared on the soundtrack for the Arnold Schwarzenegger movie Last Action Hero.  The song was a hit, becoming Billboard'''s #1 rock track and hit #5 on the Canadian charts.

Recording
The album took five months to record.  Production started at the Record Plant Studios in New York City, but the band became dissatisfied with the sound there and moved to Los Angeles' Ocean Way Studios. Getting the right drum sound at the Record Plant had proved impossible, with Rubin even isolating the drums in a tent in the studio and lining the walls and ceiling with material to soak up the extra sound the room generated. Although the band was immediately satisfied with the Ocean Way Studios, Rubin and Malcolm Young clashed over the album's direction, with Rubin demanding as many as 50 retakes on some songs, and rumours persist that Rubin was often absent from the studio and left the band to their own devices while he reportedly saw to the recording of the Red Hot Chili Peppers' One Hot Minute album at the same time. In a 1995 interview with Guitar World, Young played down the tension between him and Rubin, although he did admit to Le Monde in October 2000, "Working with him was a mistake." Mike Fraser was also credited for recording, engineering and mixing the album.  Marvel Comics contributed to Ballbreaker's cover art.

Composition
"Burnin' Alive" was written about the cult followers in Waco, Texas, who were burnt to death in 1993 during a raid by the authorities, while "Hard as a Rock," the album's first single, dated back to the Who Made Who sessions  The music video for "Hard as a Rock" was directed by David Mallet and was set at the Bray Studios in Windsor, Berkshire.  In the video, which is reminiscent of the Mallet-directed "Thunderstruck" from 1990, lead guitarist Angus Young is seen playing his Gibson SG on a wrecking ball, which destroys a building.  "Cover You in Oil" features a typically licentious lyric ("I see a young girl in the neighbourhood...I must confess I'd like to run my hands up and down her legs..."). "The Furor" and "Hail Caesar" also see the band making an uncharacteristic dip into social commentary.  Malcolm Young stated in an interview:

Reception

The initial shipments of Ballbreaker, outside of Japan and Australia, were 2.5 million copies. In AC/DC's native Australia, Ballbreaker topped the ARIA Charts and was certified gold the day of release, with 35,000 units sold. The album reached the top 10 in many countries, including  #4 in the U.S., #6 in the U.K., and topping the Finland, Sweden and Switzerland charts. It is currently certified 2× platinum by the RIAA in the US, for sales in excess of two million.  Jancee Dunn of Rolling Stone awarded the album two out of five stars, writing, "Their longevity can be credited to two factors: nostalgia and the fact that AC/DC still view the world through the mind of a horny 15-year-old. God knows there's more than enough of them to go around."  AllMusic's Stephen Thomas Erlewine notes, "Although 'Hard as a Rock' comes close, there aren't any songs as immediately memorable as any of their '70s classics, or even 'Moneytalks.' However, unlike any record since Back in Black, there are no bad songs on the album."  Ultimate Classic Rock: "With the Young brothers' songwriting confidence restored by their recent chart revival, Rudd's inimitable percussive prowess making AC/DC sound like themselves once again, and Rubin's almost religious commitment to unearthing the band's authentic '70s sound (even hunting down rare, surviving Marshall valve amplifiers – not digital), Ballbreaker'' had all the makings of an AC/DC purist's dream-come-true, plus a little something for almost everyone."

Track listing

Chart positions

Weekly charts

Year-end charts

Personnel

AC/DC
Angus Young – lead guitar
Malcolm Young – rhythm guitar, backing vocals
Brian Johnson – lead vocals
Cliff Williams – bass guitar, backing vocals
Phil Rudd – drums, percussion

Production
Produced by Rick Rubin 
Co-Produced by Mike Fraser 
Pre-production Engineer: Noel Rafferty
Recorded, engineered and mixed by Mike Fraser
Assistant recording engineers: Mark Dernley, Steve Holroyd, Brandon Harris, Kyle Bess, Rory Romano
Mastered by George Marino
Management: Stewart Young and Steve Barnett
Album art: David McMacken

Certifications

References

External links
 
 Lyrics on AC/DC's official website

AC/DC albums
1995 albums
Elektra Records albums
Albums produced by Rick Rubin
Albums produced by Mike Fraser